The Justice Ministry Workers' Union (Zenhomu) is a trade union representing workers at the Ministry of Justice in Japan.

The union was founded in 1947, and was soon affiliated with the National Council of Government and Public Workers' Unions, and later with the General Council of Trade Unions of Japan (Sohyo).  In 1975, it became part of the new Japan Federation of National Public Service Employees' Unions, while retaining its separate identity.  In 1980, the union had 10,298 members, but by 2021 this had fallen to around 5,000.

References

External links

Civil service trade unions
Trade unions established in 1947
Trade unions in Japan